California Comet may refer to the following:

Maurice E. McLoughlin (1890-1957), American tennis player.
Harold Davis (athlete) (1921-2007), American track and field athlete.
Silky Sullivan (1955-1977), American thoroughbred race horse.
Swaps (horse) (1952–1972), American thoroughbred race horse.